Tremari Jerelle "T. J." Brunson (born December 3, 1997) is an American football linebacker who is currently a free agent. He played college football at South Carolina and graduated with his Bachelor’s in December 2019.

Early life and high school
Brunson grew up in Columbia, South Carolina and attended Richland Northeast High School. As a junior, he had 134 tackles and four sacks before suffering a season-ending hip injury. Going into his senior year, he committed to play college football at Louisville over offers from South Carolina, NC State, Georgia Southern, North Carolina, East Carolina, and Appalachian State. He recorded 140 tackles as a senior and helped lead Richland Northeast to the Class 3A state playoffs. He decided to flip his commitment to South Carolina at the end of the season after a recruiting push by then-new head coach Will Muschamp.

College career
Brunson played four seasons with the South Carolina Gamecocks. He played mostly on special teams and occasionally as a reserve linebacker as a true freshman. Brunson was named a starter at linebacker going into his sophomore season and finished the year as South Carolina's second-leading tackler with 88 along with 4.5 tackles for loss and 2 sacks and three fumble recoveries. He was named to ESPN's All-Bowl team after making 13 tackles and his first two career sacks against Michigan in the 2018 Outback Bowl. He led the Gamecocks with 106 tackles and 10.5 tackles for loss with four sacks in his junior season. As a senior, Brunson recorded 77 tackles, six tackles for loss and five passes broken up as a senior. He finished his collegiate career with 283 tackles, six sacks, 21 tackles for loss, and six passes defensed.

Professional career
Brunson was selected by the New York Giants with the 238th overall pick in the seventh round of the 2020 NFL Draft. Brunson made his NFL debut on October 22, 2020, in a 22-21 loss to the Philadelphia Eagles, making one tackle on special teams.

After the first game of the 2021 preseason against the Jets, Brunson tore his ACL and was placed on season-ending injured reserve.

On June 10, 2022, Brunson was waived.

References

External links
South Carolina Gamecocks bio
New York Giants bio

1997 births
Living people
Players of American football from Columbia, South Carolina
American football linebackers
South Carolina Gamecocks football players
New York Giants players